Small Flowery Miao is a Miao language of China spoken by the Gha-Mu people. It is closely related to the Hmong dialects of China and Laos. Hmong and Small Flowery Miao are listed as the first and second local dialects of the Chuanqiandian cluster of West Hmongic languages. It is spoken in Nayong, Shuicheng, Zhenning, Guanling, and Hezhang counties of western Guizhou, China.

References

West Hmongic languages
Languages of China